The 1995 Nobel Prize in Literature was awarded to the Irish poet Seamus Heaney (1939–2013) "for works of lyrical beauty and ethical depth, which exalt everyday miracles and the living past." He is the fourth Irish Nobel laureate after the playwright Samuel Beckett in 1969.

Laureate

Seamus Heaney's poetry is often down-to-earth where he paints the gray and damp Irish landscape. His poems are often connected with daily experiences, but they also derive motifs from history, all the way back to prehistoric times. Heaney's profound interest in the Celtic and the pre-Christian as well as in Catholic literary tradition has found expression in a number of essays and translations such as The Cure at Troy (1990) and Beowulf: A New Verse Translation (1999). Among his best-known collections include Death of a Naturalist (1966), Wintering Out (1972), North (1975), Station Island (1984), The Haw Lantern (1987), and The Spirit Level (1996).

Reactions
He was on holiday in Greece with his wife when the news broke. Neither journalists nor his own children could reach him until he arrived at Dublin Airport two days later, although an Irish television camera traced him to Kalamata. Asked how he felt to have his name added to the Irish Nobel pantheon of W. B. Yeats, George Bernard Shaw and Samuel Beckett, Heaney responded: "It's like being a little foothill at the bottom of a mountain range. You hope you just live up to it. It's extraordinary." He and his wife Marie were immediately taken from the airport to Áras an Uachtaráin for champagne with President Mary Robinson. He would refer to the prize discreetly as "the N thing" in personal exchanges with others.

References

External links
1995 Press release nobelprize.org
Award ceremony speech nobelprize.org

1995